The OWSD-Elsevier Foundation Awards for Early-Career Women Scientists in the Developing World are awarded annually to early-career women scientists in selected developing countries in four regions: Latin America and the Caribbean, East and Southeast Asia and the Pacific, Central and South Asia, and Sub-Saharan Africa.

The Organization for Women in Science for the Developing World (OWSD), the Elsevier Foundation, and The World Academy of Sciences have partnered to recognize achievements of early-career women scientists in developing countries since the award was launched in 2011 as the Elsevier Foundation-OWSD Awards for Young Women Scientists from the Developing World. The award program is open to female scientists who live and work in one of 81 developing countries. Nominations are generally submitted within ten years of the nominee earning a PhD.

The maximum number of recipients is currently restricted to five per year: one from each of the four OWSD-recognized regions, plus one additional outstanding candidate, and the awards are granted with a rotating theme annually among three general fields: biological sciences (agriculture, biology and medicine), engineering/innovation & technology, and physical sciences (including chemistry, mathematics and physics). There were six awardees in 2022 as two outstanding candidates were recognised.

As of 2014, the award included an honorarium of 5,000, an entire year of access to Elsevier's ScienceDirect publication database, and an expense-paid trip to the annual meeting of the American Association for the Advancement of Science, where the awarding ceremony is held.

Recipients
Recipients have included:

2011
The 2011 awards recognized eleven contributors to biology, physics, and chemistry.
 Mahfuza Begum, biologist, Bangladesh
 Rukmani Mohanta, physicist, India
 Farzana Shaheen, chemist, Pakistan
 Janet Ayobami Adermola, physicist, Nigeria
 Aderoju Amoke Osowole, chemist, Nigeria
 Denise Evans, biologist, South Africa
 Nahla Ismail, chemist, Egypt
 Lubna Tahtamoouni, biologist, Jordan
 María Magdalena González Sánchez, astrophysicist, Mexico
 Lisset Hermida Cruz, biologist, Cuba
 Silvina Pellegrinet, chemist, Argentina

2013
The 2013 awards were focused on medical science and public health.
Adediwura Fred-Jaiyesimi, pharmacologist, Nigeria
Nasima Akhter, medical scientist, Bangladesh
Dionicia Gamboa, molecular biologist, Peru
Namjil Erdenechimeg, biochemist, Mongolia
Huda Omer Basaleem, community health researcher, Yemen

2014
The 2014 awards were focused on chemistry.
Nilufar Mamadalieva, bioorganic chemist, Uzbekistan
Leni Ritmaleni, pharmaceutical chemist, Indonesia
Simone Ann Marie Badal McCreath, biochemistry researcher, Jamaica
Eqbal Mohammed Abdu Dauqan, biotechnologist, Yemen
Taiwo Olayemi Elufioye, pharmacologist, Nigeria

2015
In 2015, the awards were focused on physics and mathematics.
Nashwa Eassa,  nano-particle physicist, Sudan
Dang Thi Oanh, computational mathematician, Thailand
Mojisola Oluwyemisi Adeniyi, atmospheric physicist, Nigeria
Mojisola Usikalu, radiation physicist, Nigeria
Rabia Salihu Sa'id, environmental physicist, Nigeria

2016
The 2016 awards focused on medical science and public health.
Sri Fatmawati, pharmacologist, Indonesia
Sushila Maharjan, biochemistry researcher, Nepal
Magaly Blas, public health specialist, Peru
Etheldreda Nakimuli-Mpungu, psychiatric epidemiologist, Uganda
Ghanya Naji Mohammed Al-Naqeb, nutritional researcher, Yemen

2017
The 2017 awards were focused on engineering and technology.
Tanzima Hashem, computer scientist, Bangladesh
María Fernanda Rivera Velásquez, environmentalist, Ecuador
Felycia Edi Soetaredjo, environmental energy specialist, Indonesia
Grace Ofori-Sarpong, environmental resource management, Ghana
Rania Mokhtar, scientific project coordinator, Sudan

2018
The 2018 awards focused on mathematics, chemistry, and physics.
Hasibun Naher, applied mathematician, Bangladesh
Germaine Djuidje Kenmoe, physicist, Cameroon
Silvia González Pérez, computational chemist, Ecuador
Dawn Iona Fox, environmental chemist, Guyana
Witri Wahyu Lestari, organometallic chemist, Indonesia

2019
The 2019 awards focused on medical science and public health.
 Narel Y. Paniagua-Zambrana, ethnobotonist, Bolivia
 Uduak Okomo, health services, Nigeria
 Tabassum Mumtaz, environmental biotechnologist, Bangladesh
 Amira Shaheen, public health researcher, Palestine
 Tista Prasai Joshi, chemist, Nepal

2020
The 2020 awards recognised researchers working in engineering, innovation and technology.
 Susana Arrechea, chemical engineer and nanotechnologist, Guatemala
 Champika Ellawalla Kankanamge, environmental engineer, Sri Lanka
 Chao Mbogo, computer scientist, Kenya
 Samia Subrina, electronic engineer and nanotechnologist, Bangladesh
 Fathiah Zakham, bioengineer and microbiologist, Yemen

2021
The 2021 awards recognised researchers in the physical sciences.
 María Eugenia Cabrera Catalán, particle physicist, Guatemala
 Khongorzul Dorjgotov, financial mathematician, Mongolia
 Ghada Dushaq, applied physicist and nanotechnologist, Palestine
 Imalka Munaweera, synthetic chemist and nanochemist, Sri Lanka
 Marian Asantewah Nkansah, environmental chemist, Ghana

2022
The 2022 awards recognised six researchers in climate action and the environment.
 Abeer Ahmed Qaed Ahmed, microbiologist, Yemen
 Heyddy Calderon, hydrologist, Nicaragua
 Gawsia Wahidunnessa Chowdhury, aquatic ecologist, Bangladesh
 Flor de Mayo González Miranda, environmental engineer, Guatemala
 Myriam Mujawamariya, forest ecologist and ecophysiologist, Rwanda
 Ashani Savinda Ranathunga, geotechnical engineer, Sri Lanka

References

Science and technology awards
Science awards honoring women